Hello Inspector is an Indian suspense thriller TV serial starring Ravi Kishan that aired on DD Metro in 2002. The series was produced by Sri Adhikari Brothers Television Network Limited (SABTNL) and was directed by Heeren Adhikari.

Ravi Kishan plays the main role of Inspector Vijay, who solves crimes, usually over two episodes.

Cast

Main 
Ravi Kishan as Inspector Vijay

Episodic appearances 
 Nagesh Bhonsle as Shekhar Kapoor (Episode 1 & Episode 2)
 Jyoti Joshi as Deepti Bhatnagar (Episode 1 & Episode 2)
 Geeta Tyagi as 
 Raina Rahul Jaiswal (Episode 3 to Episode 5)
 Sujata Rakesh Malhotra (Episode 19 & Episode 20)
 Bobby Vats as Rahul Jaiswal (Episode 3 to Episode 5)
 Shraddha Sharma as Sheela John D' Silva (Episode 3 to Episode 5)
 Lalit Parimoo (Episode 3 to Episode 5)
 Pankaj Berry as
 Judge Krishnakant Sahay (Episode 6 & Episode 7)
 Shreekant Sahay (Episode 6 & Episode 7)
 Sulabha Arya (Episode 6 & Episode 7)
 Suhas Khandke as Dr. Agnihotri (Episode 7)
 Bhairavi Raichura as Kavita Rakesh Ranjan (Episode 8 to Episode 10)
 Avinash Sahijwani as Rakesh Ranjan (Episode 8 to Episode 10)
 Vinod Kapoor as Dr. Ajay Verma (Episode 8 to Episode 10)
 Ami Trivedi as Sapna (Episode 11 & Episode 12)
 Sumeet Kaul as Suraj Mehra (Episode 11 & Episode 12)
 Suresh Chatwal as 
 Mr. Bajaj (Episode 11 & Episode 12)
 (Episode 32)
 Manav Sohal as Abhijeet Roy (Episode 13 to Episode 15)
 Ajay Trehan as Advocate Ratra (Episode 13 to Episode 15)
 Kishori Shahane as Shalini Gupta (Episode 16 to Episode 18)
 Nivedita Bhattacharya as Kamini Gupta (Episode 16 to Episode 18)
 Prithvi as Aniruddh Kumar (Episode 16 to Episode 18)
 Nishikant Dixit as Rakesh Malhotra (Episode 19 & Episode 20)
 Pratap Sachdev (Episode 21 & Episode 22)
 Prachi Shah as 
 Sushmeeta (Episode 23)
 Malini (After Plastic Surgery) (Episode 23 & Episode 24)
 Adarsh Gautam as Deepak (Episode 23)
 Jitendra Trehan as Advocate Prashant Agarwal (Episode 23 & Episode 24)
 Pankaj Dheer as Judge Vikram Singh Chauhan (Episode 25 to Episode 27)
 Zaheed Ali as Advocate Rajan Verma (Episode 25 to Episode 27)
 Mona Parekh as Reema Khosla (Episode 25 to Episode 27)
 Pratichi Mishra as Nirmala Vikram Singh Chauhan (Episode 25 to Episode 27)
 Nikhil Diwan as Prakash (Episode 25 to Episode 27)
 Somesh Agarwal (Episode 25 to Episode 27)
 Gufi Paintal (Episode 28, Episode 30 & Episode 31)
 Mithilesh Chaturvedi (Episode 28 to Episode 31)
 Rajesh Puri (Episode 32 & Episode 33)
 Rajendra Chawla (Episode 32 & Episode 33)
 Sachin Khurana (Episode 32)
 Sanjeev Seth as Sanjay Mathur (Episode 34 to Episode 36)
 Jaya Mathur as Jyoti Sanjay Mathur (Episode 34 to Episode 36)
 Firdaus Mevawala as Advocate Batliwala (Episode 34 to Episode 36)
 Manish Garg (Episode 34 to Episode 36)

References 

DD Metro original programming
2002 Indian television series debuts
Fictional portrayals of police departments in India